This is a list of masters of Christ's College, Cambridge. The head of Christ's College is termed the "Master". Christ's grew from God's House, an institution founded in 1437 on land now occupied by King's College Chapel. It received its first royal licence in 1446. It moved to its present site in 1448 when it received its second royal licence. It was renamed Christ's College and received its present charter in 1505 when it was endowed and expanded by Lady Margaret Beaufort, mother of King Henry VII. The last Proctor of God's House, John Sickling, became the first Master of the new college.

List of masters

 1505–1507 John Sickling
 1507–1510 Richard Wyot
 1510–1517 Thomas Thompson
 1517–1530 John Watson
 1530–1548 Henry Lockwood
 1548–1553 Richard Wilkes
 1553–1556 Cuthbert Scott
 1556–1559 William Taylor
 1559–1582 Edward Hawford
 1582–1609 Edmund Barwell
 1609–1622 Valentine Cary
 1622–1646 Thomas Bainbridge
 1646–1654 Samuel Bolton
 1654–1688 Ralph Cudworth
 1688–1722 John Covel
 1723–1745 William Towers
 1745–1754 George Henry Rooke
 1754–1780 Hugh Thomas
 1780–1808 John Barker
 1808–1814 Thomas Browne
 1814–1830 John Kaye
 1830–1848 John Graham
 1849–1849 Joseph Shaw
 1849–1881 James Cartmell
 1881–1887 Charles Anthony Swainson
 1887–1910 John Peile
 1910–1927 Sir Arthur Shipley
 1927–1936 Norman McLean  
 1936–1939 Charles Galton Darwin
 1939–1950 Charles Raven  
 1950–1963 Brian Downs
 1963–1978 The Lord Todd
 1978–1982 Sir John H. Plumb
 1982–1995 Sir Hans Kornberg   
 1995–2002 Alan Munro
 2002–2006 Malcolm Bowie
 2006–2016 Frank Kelly
 2016–2022 Jane Stapleton
 2022 (incumbent) The Lord McDonald of Salford

References

Masters
 
Christ's